Hofsee is a lake at Satow, Fünfseen, Mecklenburgische Seenplatte, Mecklenburg-Vorpommern, Germany. At an elevation of 90.3 m, its surface area is 0.127 km².

Lakes of Mecklenburg-Western Pomerania